Korean Dishes, also known as Chosŏn ryori, is a North Korean website.

Access to the website is blocked in South Korea on the basis of the National Security Act.

The association also publishes a magazine of the same name.

References

External links 
 

North Korean cuisine
North Korean websites
Cooking websites